The 1970 Calgary Stampeders finished in 3rd place in the Western Conference with a 9–7 record. They appeared in the Grey Cup where they lost to the Montreal Alouettes.

Regular season

Season standings

Season schedule

Playoffs

West Semi-Final

West Final

 Calgary wins the best of three series 2–1. The Stampeders will advance to the Grey Cup Championship game.

Grey Cup

Awards and records
CFL's Most Outstanding Lineman Award – Wayne Harris (LB)

1970 CFL All-Stars
RB – Hugh McKinnis, CFL All-Star
TE – Herman Harrison, CFL All-Star
LB – Wayne Harris, CFL All-Star

Videos
Game 3 of the Western finals in its entirety

References

Calgary Stampeders seasons
N. J. Taylor Trophy championship seasons
1970 Canadian Football League season by team